is a group of islets in the Sea of Japan about  west of the Japanese main island of Honshu. It is administered as part of the town of Fukaura in Aomori Prefecture and is the prefecture's westernmost point. The islets are the peaks of a submarine volcano.

Geography
The islets are the peaks of a submarine volcano.

The islets are surrounded by rocky reefs that are difficult to navigate, but the largest island has a quay built on to it. Due to this difficulty, the Japan Coast Guard only visits the islands once a year to do inspections on their lighthouse.

Geology
The volcano that makes up Kyūroku-jima formed about 3.32 million years ago. The rock that is above the ocean surface is made up of dark-colored alkali basalt and a yellow tuff, each of which are distinctly visible to visitors. It is comparable to nearby Mount Iwaki, which also has a prominence of around  relative to Shirakami-Sanchi.

History
Kyūroku-jima was charted in 1786 by merchants, though the area had been known as a fishing ground since the sixteenth century when a fisherman named Kyūroku crashed on the islands, giving them their name. The islets were first observed by Europeans in 1855, when the crew of the  spotted them covered in seals. The crew named the islets the Bittern Rocks, a name that stuck with Western sources at least until the beginning of the twentieth century.

Because of the abundance of Okhotsk atka mackerel, abalone, and kelp, the jurisdiction of the islets were disputed between the prefectures of Aomori and Akita until it was added to Aomori in 1953 and Akita received a common right of use.

Transportation
The only way the islets can be accessed is by chartering a fishing boat. It takes about two hours to reach the islands from Fukaura.

References

Fukaura, Aomori
Islands of Aomori Prefecture
Islands of the Sea of Japan
Pliocene volcanoes
Submarine calderas
Uninhabited islands of Japan
Volcanoes of Aomori Prefecture